Fraoch-eilean is a small  island with an uncertain population north of Benbecula in the Outer Hebrides of Scotland. Its name derives from the Gaelic for "heather island".

It is connected to Grimsay by a causeway and there is a settlement called Seana Bhaile. North Uist is to the north and the North Ford causeway to the west. The small islets of Eilean Roinoch and Màs Grimsay lie just offshore to the east. 19th and early 20th century Ordnance Survey maps show the island name as Seanabaily.

Population
The island was not listed in either the 2001 census as being inhabited, or in the 2011 census although it is clear from both maps and photographic evidence that there is a resident population. The problems of defining islands in this part of the Hebrides are considerable and it is likely that the population was recorded as being part of Grimsay itself, which has a population of 169 (in 2011). Thus, it has not been possible to provide either an estimate of the total or to rank the island relative to other Scottish islands. Ordnance Survey maps indicate a total of about a dozen buildings and a population in the range 10–35 is likely.

References

Footnotes

Uist islands